Saketh Myneni and Sanam Singh were the defending champions, but lost in the first round.

Somdev Devvarman and Jeevan Nedunchezhiyan won the title when James Duckworth and Luke Saville withdrew from the final.

Seeds

Draw

References
 Main Draw

Emami Kolkata Open ATP Challenger Tour - Doubles